NGC 2423-3b is an extrasolar planet approximately 2498 light-years away in the constellation of Puppis.  The planet was announced in 2007 to be orbiting the red giant star NGC 2423-3 (which in turn is part of the NGC 2423 open cluster).  The planet has a mass at least 10.6 times that of Jupiter.  Only the minimum mass is known since the orbital inclination is not known, so it may instead be a brown dwarf.

This planet was discovered by Christophe Lovis and Michel Mayor in June 2007. Lovis had also found three Neptune-mass planets orbiting HD 69830 in May 2006, also in Puppis.

See also 
 NGC 4349-127 b
 PSR B1620-26 b

References 

 SIMBAD NGC 2423 3 b

External links 

 
 

Puppis
Giant planets
Exoplanets discovered in 2007
Exoplanets detected by radial velocity